A canter is a three-beat gait performed by horses.

Canter may also refer to:

Canter rhythm and waltz
Canter (surname)
 Mitsubishi Fuso Canter, commercial vehicle
 Canter's, a deli in Los Angeles, California
 A slang term used to refer to the city of Canterbury
 "Canter" (song), a 2019 song by Gerry Cinnamon

See also
Cant (disambiguation)
Ganter (disambiguation)